Kaylene Corbett (born 15 June 1999) is a South African swimmer. She competed in the women's 100 metre breaststroke event at the 2017 World Aquatics Championships. At the 2022 Commonwealth Games, she won the bronze medal in the 200 metre breaststroke.

2021–2022
In June 2021, she qualified to represent South Africa at the 2020 Summer Olympics. She won the second semi-final of the 200 metre breaststroke and joined her teammate,  Tatjana Schoenmaker, in the final. It was the first time since Sydney 2000 that two South African women reached the finals of the same event. Corbett managed fifth place while Schoenmaker took gold.

The following year, in April 2022, she won the silver medal in the 200 metre breaststroke at the year's South Africa National Swimming Championships with a 2022 World Aquatics Championships and 2022 Commonwealth Games qualifying time of 2:24.66. In June, she was named as a member of the South Africa team for the 2022 Commonwealth Games.

2022 Commonwealth Games
In her first event as part of swimming at the 2022 Commonwealth Games, the 50 metre breaststroke, Corbett qualified for the semifinals with a time of 31.07 seconds and overall seventh-rank. She swam a time of 31.43 seconds in the semifinals, qualifying for the final along with fellow South Africans Lara van Niekerk and Tatjana Schoenmaker. The following day, she placed sixth in the final with a time of 31.10 seconds. On day three, she qualified for the final of the 200 metre breaststroke ranking fourth in the preliminaries with a time of 2:25.08. In the final, she finished less than two seconds behind gold medalist Tatjana Schoenmaker with a time of 2:23.67 and won the bronze medal. For the preliminaries of the 100 metre breaststroke on day four, she swam a 1:08.12 and qualified for the semifinals ranking eighth. Dropping 0.16 seconds from her time in the semifinals, she ranked seventh and advanced to the final. In the final, she improved her time to a 1:07.62 and placed seventh.

References

External links
 

1999 births
Living people
Female breaststroke swimmers
Sportspeople from Bloemfontein
South African female swimmers
Sportspeople from Port Elizabeth
Swimmers at the 2018 Commonwealth Games
Swimmers at the 2022 Commonwealth Games
Commonwealth Games medallists in swimming
Commonwealth Games bronze medallists for South Africa
African Games gold medalists for South Africa
African Games medalists in swimming
Swimmers at the 2019 African Games
Swimmers at the 2020 Summer Olympics
Olympic swimmers of South Africa
Competitors at the 2019 Summer Universiade
20th-century South African women
21st-century South African women
Medallists at the 2022 Commonwealth Games